The 2010 European Women Sevens Championship was the eighth edition of the European Women's Sevens Championship.

European Emerging Nations Tournament
Venue/Date: 21 March 2010 at Ljubljana
Hungary 48-0 Croatia
Hungary 38-0 Austria
Hungary 41-0 Slovenia
Other scores not published

European Emerging Nations Camp Tournament
'''Venue/Date: 4 April 2010 at Zanka
Pool A
Hungary 21-5 Finland
Czech Republic 19-0 Austria
Finland 0-27 Poland
Poland 10-14 Hungary
Austria 10-17 Poland
Finland 0-26 Czech Republic
Austria 5-29 Hungary
Czech Republic 7-12 Poland
Finland 5-14 Austria
Czech Republic 0-26 Hungary

Pool B
Barbarians 5-7 Mladost Zagreb
Denmark 10-7 Luxembourg
Mladost Zagreb 21-5 Slovenia
Denmark 12-0 Barbarians
Luxembourg 19-15 Slovenia
Mladost Zagreb 14-10 Denmark
Luxembourg 32-0 Barbarians
Denmark 44-0 Slovenia
Mladost Zagreb 35-0 Luxembourg
Slovenia 41-0 Barbarians9th placeSlovenia 12-17 Barbarians7th placeDenmark 12-0 Luxembourg5th placeFinland 22-17 Mladost Zagreb3rd placeCzech Republic 17-12 AustriaFinalHungary 24-0 Poland

 F-EN League  Venue/Date: 26 April 2010, Székesfehérvár, Hungary.
Austria 7-25 Slovenia
Hungary 12-19 Czech Republic
Croatia 19-15 Czech Republic
Hungary 48-0 Austria
Slovenia 0-35 Croatia
Czech Republic 33-0 Austria
Croatia 0-52 Hungary
Slovenia 0-41  Czech Republic
Austria 5-22 Croatia
Hungary 12-7 Slovenia

 FIRA-AER Tournament 2010 - Division A Venue/Date: 22–23 May 2010, Bucharest, Romania.

Pool Stages
Group A

Austria 12-5 Croatia
Belgium 19-0 Andorra
Moldova 40-0 Bulgaria
Andorra 12-0 Croatia
Austria 19-0 Bulgaria
Moldova 7-7 Belgium
Bulgaria 0-24 Croatia
Moldova 5-0 Andorra
Belgium 24-0 Austria
Andorra 24-0 Bulgaria
Belgium 10-0 Croatia
Moldova 29-5 Austria
Belgium 24-0 Bulgaria
Austria 12-0 Andorra
Moldova 15-5 Croatia
Group B

Israel 0-31 Switzerland
Malta 7-12 Romania
Czech Republic 10-0 Latvia
Romania 5-24 Switzerland
Israel 0-10 Latvia
Czech Republic 14-7 Malta
Latvia 5-10 Switzerland
Czech Republic 5-26 Romania
Malta 5-5 Israel
Romania 22-0 Latvia
Malta 0-20 Switzerland
Czech Republic 10-0 Israel
Malta 5-14 Latvia
Israel 0-22 Romania
Czech Republic 0-36 Switzerland

Classification StagesBowl SemisCroatia 15-0 Israel
Bulgaria 17-12 MaltaPlate FinalAustria 0-17 Latvia
Andorra 10-5 Czech RepublicCup SemisMoldova 20-0 Romania
Belgium 0-15 Switzerland11th PlaceIsrael 15-5 MaltaBowl finalCroatia 17-0 Bulgaria7th PlaceAustria 7-10 Czech RepublicPlate FinalLatvia 7-5 Andorra3rd placeRomania 0-26 BelgiumCup FinalMoldova 19-17 Switzerland

 FIRA-AER Tournament 2010 - Division B Venue/Date: 22–23 May 2010, Odense, Denmark.

Pool Stages
Group A

Georgia 7-0 Nordic Barbarians
Ukraine 52-0 Slovenia
Poland 24-0 Serbia
Slovenia 0-5 Nordic Barbarians
Georgia 35-0 Serbia
Poland 0-31 Ukraine
Serbia 0-24 Nordic Barbarians
Poland 42-0 Slovenia
Ukraine 26-7 Georgia
Slovenia 0-12 Serbia
Ukraine 20-0 Nordic Barbarians
Poland 14-14 Georgia
Ukraine 69-0 Serbia
Georgia 31-0 Slovenia
Poland 22-0 Nordic Barbarians
Group B

Luxembourg 12-31 Lithuania
Denmark 22-0 Bosnia-Herzegovina
Hungary 19-0 Norway
Bosnia-Herzegovina 0-31 Lithuania
Luxembourg 0-34 Norway
Hungary 26-17 Denmark
Norway 21-5 Lithuania
Hungary 41-0 Bosnia-Herzegovina
Denmark 34-0 Luxembourg
Bosnia-Herzegovina 0-54 Norway
Denmark 5-12 Lithuania
Hungary 57-5 Luxembourg
Denmark 0-19 Norway
Luxembourg 7-0 Bosnia-Herzegovina
Hungary 33-0 Lithuania

Classification StagesBowl SemisBosnia-Herzegovina 5-7 Serbia
Slovenia 5-22 LuxembourgPlate FinalGeorgia 19-15 Denmark
Nordic Barbarians 0-7 LithuaniaCup SemisUkraine 15-0 Norway
Poland 0-43 Hungary11th PlaceSerbia 0-15 SloveniaBowl finalBosnia-Herzegovina 12-17 Luxembourg7th PlaceDenmark 10-7 Nordic BarbariansPlate FinalGeorgia 31-5 Lithuania3rd placeNorway 12-0 PolandCup FinalUkraine 41-0 Hungary

European Emerging Nations TournamentVenue/Date:'' 6 June 2010 at Vienna
Hungary 17-7 Croatia
Hungary 24-12 Austria
Hungary 43-0 Slovenia
Other scores not published

FIRA-AER Tournament 2010 - Top 10 
Venue/Date: 10–11 July 2010, Moscow, Russia.

Pool Stages
Group A

Sweden 5-29 England
Germany 7-35 France
England 7-17 Italy
Germany 26-0 Sweden
France 5-5 Italy
England 56-0 Germany
France 26-12 Sweden
Germany 7-19 Italy
England 10-12 France
Italy 36-0 Sweden
Group B

Finland 0-47 Spain
Netherlands 17-12 Portugal
Spain 21-0 Russia
Netherlands 33-5 Finland
Portugal 7-7 Russia
Spain 24-0 Pays-Bas
Portugal 14-7 Finland
Netherlands 21-5 Russia
Spain 24-12 Portugal
Russia 36-0 Finland

Classification Stages
Plate Semis
England 12-7 Portugal
Germany 7-12 Russia
Cup Semis
Italy 15-21 Netherlands
France 0-21 Spain
9th Place - Bowl final
Finland 17-24 Sweden
7th Place 
Germany 7-33 Portugal
Plate Final - 5th place
England 13-10 (10-10) Russia
3rd place 
Italy 0-12 France
Cup Final
Netherlands 12-28 Spain

F-EN League  
Venue/Date: 19 September 2010, Zagreb, Croatia.
Not all scores are available. 1st Hungary, 2nd Battai Buldogok Női (Hungary), 3rd Mladost Zagreb, 4th Nada Split, 5th Slovenia
Hungary 29-0 Slovenia
Nada Split 5-35 Hungary
Mladost Zagreb 7-22 Hungary
Hungary 21-7 Battai Buldogok Női (Hungary)

Venue/Date: 10 October 2010, Ljubljana, Slovenia.
Slovenia 10-38 Hungary 
Croatia 12-17 Battai Buldogok Női (Hungary)
Hungary 17-14 Battai Buldogok Női (Hungary)
Slovenia 0-41 Croatia
Slovenia 5-33 Battai Buldogok Női (Hungary)
Hungary 17-0 Croatia

Venue/Date: 30 October 2010, Vienna.
Austria 10-25 Hungary "A"
Hungary "B" 15-25 Slovenia
Hungary "A" 50-0 Hungary "B"
Austria 20-10 Hungary "B"
Hungary "A" 40-10 Slovenia

Venue/Date: 13 November 2010, Székesfehérvár, Hungary.
Hungary 14-14 Croatia
Serbia 24-24 Slovenia
Hungary 12-5 Austria
Croatia 0-10 Austria
Hungary 50-7 Serbia
Austria 21-12 Slovenia
Croatia 38-0 Serbia
Hungary 40-5 Slovenia
Austria 45-0 Serbia
Croatia 20-7 Slovenia

References

Rugby Europe Women's Sevens
2010 rugby sevens competitions
Sevens
Sevens